Pak Chung-il (born 3 January 1987) is a North Korean international football player.

International goals
Goals for Senior National Team

External links

1987 births
Living people
North Korean footballers
North Korea international footballers
Association football midfielders